Bustylus is an extinct genus of eutherians in the family Adapisoriculidae. It was described by Emmanuel Gheerbrandt and Russell in 1991, and the type species is B. cernaysi, described from the late Paleocene of Cernay, France (from which the species epithet was derived), and possibly also from Germany. Gheerbrandt later redescribed the species Peradectes marandati (Crochet and Sigé, 1983) as a species of Bustylus. A third species, B. folieae, was described from the early Paleocene of Belgium by Eric De Bast, Bernard Sigé and Thierry Smith in 2012. B. folieae was named in honour of Dr. Annelise Folie.

Species
 Bustylus cernaysi Gheerbrandt & Russell, 1991
 Bustylus marandati (Crochet & Sigé, 1983)
 Bustylus folieae De Bast et al., 2012

References

Extinct mammals of Europe
Prehistoric eutherians
Paleocene mammals
Fossil taxa described in 1991
Prehistoric mammal genera